Betton (Gallo: Beton) is a commune in the Ille-et-Vilaine department in Brittany in northwestern France. It is nine kilometers north of the centre of Rennes.

Population
Inhabitants of Betton are called Bettonnais in French.

See also
Communes of the Ille-et-Vilaine department

References

External links

Official website 
Mayors of Ille-et-Vilaine Association 

Communes of Ille-et-Vilaine